Ralph John Perou (born May 1970), known professionally as Perou and @mrperou on social media, is a British fashion, portrait and music photographer who has also appeared as a judge on Make Me a Supermodel UK and on season 2 of Bravo TV's American Make Me a Supermodel. He was part of the T.V series called "Dirty Sexy Things" on the British network E4 which aired in 2011. Perou photographed models to be put in his exhibition at the end of the series.

Early life
Perou was born in Newick, a small village in East Sussex, England. Perou has stated that he, ‘had a very happy, carefree childhood growing up in the countryside. It's where I discovered my love of English cider’
He went to primary school at Newick Church of England school and completed secondary school at Chailey and Haywards Heath Sixth form. When Perou finished his Religious Studies and Design A levels he considered a career as a long-distance lorry driver or as a missionary. But Perou states that he ‘saw the dark’ and after a short stint as a butler he completed a BTEC OND in Design Photography at North East Surrey College of Technology.

Between 1991-1994 Perou studied for a BA Hons degree in Photography, Film and Video Arts at the University of Westminster.

In 1998 Perou met his wife, Lucy on Burgh Island in Devon.
Perou has two sons with Lucy: Maximum Perou (born 2002) and Z Perou (born 2005)
They were married in St.Nicholas at Wade church in Kent in 2007.

Professional career

After graduating in 1994 Perou worked at Click Studios in London as a studio manager.

It was during his time at Click Studios that Perou learned photography professionally. He started shooting for editorial clients like Time Out, Skin Two and Dazed & Confused magazines. He also started shooting bands, following work that he did with his friends who were in the band Elcka.

In 1995, Perou moved to the first floor of a converted fire station in Old Street, London. Shortly after, Dazed & Confused relocated to the ground floor of the same building and Perou started working on the picture desk with the photographic director, Phil Poynter. Perou continued to shoot for magazines and record companies and left Dazed & Confused around 1997. One of his musician shoots was with British singer/songwriter Gary Numan for his 1997 album Exile alongside Joseph Cultice.

Perou was initially known as a ‘fetish photographer’ through his early work for Skin Two magazine and after being featured in the book Fetish: Masters of Erotic Fantasy Photography.

In 2000, Perou opened the photographic studio, the ‘Perou Factory’ in Hackney Wick (an industrial estate in the east of London). In 2006 the London Development Agency ‘compulsory purchased’ the Perou Factory as part of redevelopments for the 2012 Olympics. Perou and his family relocated to the East Kent coast.

In 2012, Perou with a team of supportive volunteers, started renovating a dilapidated warehouse in Bow, East London. In 2013 it was launched as 'The Bow Bunker', which is a flexible place for photography, film and very special events.

In May 2014 issue one of EDICT magazine was released. Perou is the Editor in Chief of EDICT.  
EDICT magazine is art directed and designed by Peter & Paul. 
The premise of the magazine is 'There's too much of everything. Here's some more'. 
Each issue features one artist recommending one piece of art or other artist; one musician recommending one other band or piece of music etc..
Edict is a free magazine that is distributed mainly in the UK and Tokyo, Japan.

Issue 2 of EDICT magazine was released in January 2015.
issue 3 of EDICT magazine was released in September 2016

On Friday 13th Nov 2015, Perou's first book 'Coulrophobia' was released, which features self portraits of him made up like a clown. It was made in collaboration with 19 of the world's best makeup artists and Marilyn Manson.
'Coulrophobia' (which means the fear of clowns) was designed by Peter & Paul and supported by MAC Cosmetics.

Perou's book 'Marilyn Manson by Perou: 21 years in Hell' is published by 'Reel Art Press' 

Marilyn Manson speaking of the book and Perou says, “Just because you have a f**king Instagram page does not make you Perou. That’s your quote.”

Speaking of Marilyn Manson and the book, Perou has said, “I often get asked, ‘Who was your favourite person to photograph?’ or ‘Who is the best person you’ve photographed?’. It’s always ‘Marilyn Manson.’ Which is just as well, considering how many times I’ve photographed him.”

Exhibitions
1991 BTEC graduate show in St Martins in  the Lane Crypt. London
1993 ‘A Private View by Pike and Perou’. video screening in Milk Bar, Soho
1994 PCL graduate show. Riding House Street. London
2000 ‘Bosozoku’. Tomato. Lexington street, London
2000 ‘Bosozoku’. Rapid Eye, London
2002 ‘Perou Show’ at Blink Gallery. London
2004 125 Magazine ‘Smell Issue’ (group show). London
2005 ‘Torture Garden’ Great Eastern hotel. London.
2005 ‘Torture Garden’ Galerie Bertin-Toublanc. Paris
2006 ‘Bosozoku’ Studio Apart. Amsterdam.
2006 ‘Dita Von Teese’ Parco buildings. Tokyo. Japan
2007 BT Essence of the Entrepreneur. Oxo tower Gallery. London	
2008 BT Essence of the Entrepreneur. Oxo tower Gallery. London
2008 Pet Shop Boys in National Portrait Gallery. London
2008 Camera Press Anniversary (group show) National Portrait Gallery. London
2008 125 Magazine ‘Future Issue’ (group show) AOP gallery. London
2010 The Front Room. Whitstable
2010 Perou x mr.Miller& co. 125 Magazine live art event. The Russian Club,. London 
2015 Coulrophobia. MAC Cosmetics pro store Carnaby Street. London
2015 Coulrophobia. MAC Cosmetics Paris
2015 Coulrophobia. MAC Cosmetics pro store Berlin
2015 Coulrophobia. MAC Cosmetics pro store New York. NY
2019 Big Cats. London Bridge Station. London
2020 Marilyn Manson by Perou: 21 Years in Hell. La Termica. Malaga. Spain
2022 Perou's low-fi Laser Show. Haywards Heath Arts Festival

Modelling
1995 Catwalk Comme des Garçons. Paris
1996 Catwalk  Sonja Nuttall. London
1999 Cyclefly  album cover Generation Sap
2000 Catwalk Evisu. London
2005 Vivenne Westwood Tie campaign s/s 2005.

TV
2003 Season 5 Absolutely Fabulous (cameo) in episode ‘Exploitin’ with Jean-Paul Gaultier
2004 BBC Picture of Africa.
2005 Channel 5 Make Me A Super Model UK Season 1 judge.
2006 Channel 5 Make Me A Super Model UK Season 2 judge and mentor.
2008 Celebrity Weakest Link ‘Body Beautiful’ episode.
(Perou would have been first out had he not intimidated Gok Wan into changing his vote).
2008 Bravo TV (America) Make Me A Super Model Season 2 judge.
2011 Channel 4 "Dirty Sexy Things"

Directing
1999 Marilyn Manson rockumentary God is in the TV. 
2001 Co-director with Chris Turner for Black Box Recorder 
2004 Co-director with Bill Yukich for Eighties Matchbox B-Line Disaster ‘Mister Mental’ 
2007 KT Tunstall

Published Books
2015 Coulrophobia
2020 Marilyn Manson by Perou: 21 Years in Hell
2022 Tunnel Vision

References
March 2005 British Journal of Photography: cover story and interview
March 2009 Professional Photographer: cover story and interview
Nikki Taylor, Judges Dropped from Season 2 of MMAS Realityblurred.com, January 7, 2009

External links

Photographers from Sussex
Living people
People from Newick
1970 births